Douglas Bryce Rope (11 February 1923 – 2 March 2013) was the coach of the New Zealand rugby union team from 1983 to 1984.

Biography
Rope was born in 1923 and attended Auckland Grammar School.

During World War II, Rope trained in Canada and then was a flight instructor with No. 20 OTU. He saw active service, flying fighter bombers in operations over Europe.

Rope played rugby for Auckland and New Zealand Universities in the 1940s and 1950s, as a loose forward.  He was All Blacks coach from 1983 to 1984, coaching the team to nine wins in 12 test matches.

References

 

1923 births
2013 deaths
Auckland rugby union players
New Zealand national rugby union team coaches